Nicolle D. Vazquez Aviles (born 30 September 1994) is a Puerto Rican female artistic gymnast, representing her nation at international competitions.

She competed at  the  2010 Central American and Caribbean Games, winning a bronze meal, and 2013 World Artistic Gymnastics Championships in Antwerp, Belgium.

References

External links 
Nicolle VAZQUEZ AVILES (PUR) floor - 2013 Antwerp worlds qualifs - YouTube

1994 births
Living people